Robert Barry Neely (born November 9, 1953) is a Canadian former professional ice hockey player who played 283 NHL games for the Toronto Maple Leafs and the Colorado Rockies. He was drafted first overall in the 1973 WHA Amateur Draft by the Chicago Cougars, and 10th overall by the Maple Leafs in the NHL Amateur Draft. Neely opted to sign with the Maple Leafs. In his five-season career, Neely scored 39 goals and 59 assists, with five goals and seven assists in 26 playoff games.
Bob also won a bronze medal for Team Canada 1978 in Moscow at the Izvestia Cup.

Career statistics

References

External links

1953 births
Living people
Canadian ice hockey defencemen
Canadian ice hockey forwards
Chicago Cougars draft picks
Colorado Rockies (NHL) players
Hamilton Red Wings (OHA) players
Sportspeople from Sarnia
National Hockey League first-round draft picks
New Brunswick Hawks players
Oklahoma City Blazers (1965–1977) players
Peterborough Petes (ice hockey) players
Philadelphia Firebirds (AHL) players
Toronto Maple Leafs draft picks
Toronto Maple Leafs players
World Hockey Association first-overall draft picks
Ice hockey people from Ontario
Canadian expatriate ice hockey players in the United States